The Hotel Fitness Championship was a golf tournament on the Web.com Tour. It was played for the first time in August/September 2013 at the Sycamore Hills Golf Club in Fort Wayne, Indiana. It was the first of four tournaments making up the Web.com Tour Finals, the series that replaced qualifying school for determining the 50 players earning PGA Tour cards for the following season. Proceeds from the championship benefited the Evans Scholars Foundation.

Winners

See also
Fort Wayne Open – an earlier tournament (1990–92) on the same tour

References

External links

Coverage on the Web.com Tour's official site
Sycamore Hills' official page

Former Korn Ferry Tour events
Golf in Indiana
Sports in Fort Wayne, Indiana
Recurring sporting events established in 2013
Recurring sporting events disestablished in 2015
2013 establishments in Indiana
2015 disestablishments in Indiana